Vinec may refer to places:

Vinec (Mladá Boleslav District), a municipality and village in the Czech Republic
Vinec, Rogaška Slatina, a settlement in Slovenia